Marko Tapani "Marco" Hietala (born 14 January 1966) is a Finnish heavy metal vocalist, bassist and songwriter. Internationally, he is best known as the former bassist, male vocalist and secondary composer to Tuomas Holopainen, of the symphonic metal band Nightwish. He was also the vocalist and bassist as well as composer and lyricist for the heavy metal band Tarot.

He is also a member of the supergroup Northern Kings, and portrayed one of the main characters in Ayreon's 2013 album The Theory of Everything.

Biography
Marko Hietala was born in Kuopio, and is the youngest child of the Hietala family. Hietala lived in Tervo until the age of 15, after which he moved to Kuopio to study classical guitar, vocals and musical theory in high school. In 1984, he and his brother Zachary formed the heavy metal band Tarot under the name Purgatory. In 1986, Tarot received a deal for their first album and went on tour. Before becoming a full-time musician, he worked as a live and studio sound engineer.

While on tour with Tarot in 1998, Marko had met the members of the band Nightwish in Siilinjärvi as they were an opening act for his band. Marko recalled having watched their performance: "I watched their show and thought their music was actually quite good at times. They had all this force and drama, so maybe some day they would successfully combine the two. But goddamn, they looked absolutely horrible on stage. Shorthaired guys just standing there – Tarja was a pretty girl but just as petrified, shrieking in the middle of the stage in her leather pants. Honestly, I assumed them to be just a momentary fad and thought they will fade away after six months or so. Luckily, of course, I was so wrong."

Hietala joined Nightwish in 2001 when Tuomas Holopainen and the band's manager called him and said that there would be a place in the band for a vocalist and a bass player. Century Child was his first Nightwish album, following the departure of previous bassist Sami Vänskä. He was a prominent guest musician in Delain, a project involving many members of the gothic and symphonic metal community. He also participated in the recording of Invitation, by Altaria, providing backing vocals. Hietala has also been part of the bands Sinergy and Northern Kings.

Upon his arrival to Nightwish, several songs were written to contain duets with then Nightwish vocalist Tarja Turunen, allowing songwriter and band leader Tuomas Holopainen to take advantage of Hietala's distinctive raucous voice to add a new dimension to the band. A famous example is Nightwish's cover of "The Phantom of the Opera", from the album "Century Child".

During Nightwish's shows, Turunen would take a break halfway through the set. Before Hietala joined the band, the band would perform an instrumental song during this time. After Hietala joined the band, they performed covers of well-known songs, with Hietala singing the lead vocal part in this break. The band has performed Ozzy Osbourne's "Crazy Train", W.A.S.P.'s "Wild Child", Dio's "Don't Talk to Strangers", Megadeth's "Symphony of Destruction" and Pink Floyd's "High Hopes". Some of these songs have been put up for sale as well on various Nightwish album releases. Following Turunen's departure from Nightwish, Hietala was much more involved with the production of Dark Passion Play, which was released in September 2007. He sang some songs, completely, and wrote the music for the song "The Islander", on which he also plays acoustic guitar instead of bass. Hietala is also credited alongside Holopainen for co-writing the song "The Crow, the Owl and the Dove" from Nightwish's 2011 album, Imaginaerum.

In Delain, Hietala played bass for the album Lucidity and was also the main male vocalist on the album with featured vocals on the song The Gathering. He is also featured as vocalist in two of the songs on Delain's second album April Rain and two songs from Delain's fourth album The Human Contradiction.

In March 2009, Hietala joined the band Sapattivuosi. They cover Black Sabbath songs in Finnish. In this band, however, Hietala does not play bass; he only performs vocals.

On 1 April 2010 it was said that Hietala would leave the band to concentrate on a choir career. This was identified as an April Fool's joke, but was also a reference to his participation in Kuorosota (the localized Finnish version of Clash of the Choirs) in 2010. Hietala was the master of the Kuopio choir in the program's second season. He came second in the contest, losing in the finals to the Joensuu choir, headed by pop rock singer Ilkka Alanko. Tarot's single "I Walk Forever", from the Gravity of Light album, was performed for the first time by Hietala, Tommi Salmela and the Kuopio choir during Kuorosota 2010; other songs performed included "The Phantom of the Opera", which Hietala has covered with Nightwish as well.

In June 2010, Hietala joined the heavy metal supergroup HAIL! on two occasions, performing Black Sabbath's Neon Knights with Ripper Owens, Andreas Kisser, James LoMenzo and Paul Bostaph at two of their shows in Finland.

On 14 August 2013, Hietala was the first singer to be confirmed by Arjen Lucassen to guest on Ayreon's new album The Theory of Everything. In 2017 he joined Ayreon on stage for three shows at 013 Poppodium in Tilburg, the recording of these shows was later released as Ayreon's live album Ayreon Universe – The Best of Ayreon Live.

Hietala released his first solo album Mustan sydämen rovio in May 2019. He released the album under his birthname Marko Hietala and will be using the name also in his other projects in the future. Hietala has described his solo material as "hard prog". An English version of the album, titled Pyre of the Black Heart (Nuclear Blast), followed in January 2020. Joining him on the albums are drummer Anssi Nykänen, keyboardist Vili Ollila and guitarist Tuomas Wäinölä with whom he also toured in Finland in the summer and autumn of 2019. The band embarked on a European tour in February 2020.

In 2020, he participated in and won the Finnish edition of Masked Singer.

On 12 January 2021, Hietala announced his withdrawal from the public eye and departure from Nightwish. On 22 January 2021, Swedish symphonic metal band Therion released a music video for the song "Tuonela" that featured Hietala.

On 18 June 2022, Northern Kings made a comeback that ended their 12-year hiatus and Hietala's 17-month break from the public. The band played at the 'Tuhdimmat Tahdit festival' in Nokia, Finland. Hietala later in an interview, stated that he has not made contact with the members of Nightwish since his departure from the band in January 2021, and expressed uncertainty that he will be returning to Nightwish.

Influences

Hietala has stated that the biggest influence on him as a bassist is Geezer Butler and Bob Daisley, while Ronnie James Dio and Rob Halford are his biggest influence as a vocalist. He has also stated that he listens to wide array of music ranging from "really sensitive stuff to a lot of really hard stuff", saying that he "tend[s] to soak up almost everything" which "somehow ends up being used" when he writes his own music.

Personal life 
Hietala has two children with his ex-wife Manki, twin boys Antto and Miro. His family currently live in Kuopio, Finland. When he is not touring, he enjoys reading books, playing video games, and watching movies. He especially likes fantasy, horror and science fiction books. In 2016, a Finnish newspaper reported that Hietala had filed for divorce. In August 2018, he married Camila Cavalcanti. He and his wife have a daughter, and live in Spain.

Born "Marko", Hietala has been regularly credited throughout his career as "Marco". He said he adopted the version with "c" when he was young and trying to sound "cool", but that now it doesn't matter to him anymore. Starting from Mustan sydämen rovio, he intends to be credited as Marko in all his future projects. He also referred to the "Marco" spelling as "the last lie I had constructed about myself".

Discography

Studio albums:
 Mustan sydämen rovio – 2019 (re-released in English in 2020 as Pyre of the Black Heart)

Nightwish

Studio albums:
 Century Child – 2002
 Once – 2004
 Dark Passion Play – 2007
 Imaginaerum – 2011
 Endless Forms Most Beautiful – 2015
 Human. :II: Nature. – 2020

Tarot

Studio albums:
 Spell of Iron – 1986
 Follow Me into Madness – 1988
 To Live Forever – 1993
 Stigmata – 1995
 For the Glory of Nothing – 1998
 Suffer Our Pleasures – 2003
 Crows Fly Black – 2006
 Gravity of Light – 2010
 The Spell of Iron MMXI – 2011

Northern Kings

Studio albums:
Reborn – 2007
Rethroned – 2008

Sapattivuosi
Studio albums:
 Ihmisen merkki – 2009

Sinergy
Studio albums:
 To Hell and Back – 2000
 Suicide by My Side – 2002

Raskasta joulua

Studio albums:
 Raskasta Joulua – 2004
 Raskaampaa joulua – 2006
 Raskasta Joulua – 2013
 Ragnarok Juletide – 2014
 Raskasta Joulua 2 – 2014
 Raskasta Joulua Tulkoon joulu - akustisesti – 2015
 Raskasta Joulua IV – 2017
 Viides Adventti  – 2022

Conquest
Studio albums:
 Worlds Apart – 1999

Collaborations and projects
 As guest/session member 

1990
 Warmath – Gehenna – (backing vocals, keyboards)

1999
 To/Die/For – All Eternity – (backing vocals)

2001
 Gandalf – Rock Hell – (backing vocals)
 To/Die/For – Epilogue – (backing vocals)

2002
 Dreamtale – Beyond Reality – (vocals on "Heart's Desire" & "Where the Rainbow Ends")
 Virtuocity – Secret Visions – (vocals on "Eye for an Eye" & "Speed of Light")

2003
 Aina – Days of Rising Doom – (vocals)
 Altaria – Invitation – (backing vocals)
 Charon – The Dying Daylights – (backing vocals)
 Evemaster – Wither – (vocals on "Wings of Darkness (Tarot cover)")

2004
 Shade Empire – Sinthetic – (vocals on "Human Sculpture")
 Timo Rautiainen & Trio Niskalaukaus – Kylmä tila (vocals on "Älkää selvittäkö" & "Samarialainen")

2005
 Turmion Kätilöt – Niuva 20 – (backing vocals on "Stormbringer (Deep Purple cover)")

2006
 After Forever – Mea Culpa – (vocals on single version of "Face Your Demons")
Amorphis – Eclipse – (backing vocals)
 Defuse – Defuse – (vocals on "DIB")
 Delain – Lucidity – (vocals on 5 tracks, bass guitars)
 Eternal Tears of Sorrow – Before the Bleeding Sun – (backing vocals)
 Stoner Kings – Fuck the World – (backing vocals)
 Verjnuarmu – Muanpiällinen Helevetti – (backing vocals)

2007
 Amorphis – Silent Waters – (backing vocals)
 Nuclear Blast All-Stars: Into the Light – (vocals on "Inner Sanctuary")
 Machine Men – Circus of Fools – (vocals on "The Cardinal Point")

2008
 Ebony Ark – Decoder 2.0 – (vocals on 5 tracks)

2009
 Amorphis – Skyforger – (backing vocals)
 Delain – April Rain – (vocals on "Control the Storm" & "Nothing Left")
 Marenne – The Past Prelude – (backing vocals)
 Elias Viljanen – Fire-Hearted – (vocals on "Last Breath of Love")
 Turmion Kätilöt – Lentävä KalPan Ukko – (backing vocals)
 Turmion Kätilöt – Verkko Heiluu – (backing vocals)

2010
 Erja Lyytinen – Voracious Love – (vocals on "Bed of Roses")

2011
 Grönholm – Silent Out Loud – (Vocals on ″Vanity″)

2012
 Delain – We Are the Others – (vocals on two bonus live tracks on the Digipak version)

2013
 A2Z – Parasites of Paradise – (acoustic guitar on "Nightcrawler", "Caterpillar" & "Praying Mantis")
 Ayreon – The Theory of Everything – (vocals)
 Turmion Kätilöt – Technodiktator – (backing vocals on "Jalopiina")
 Lazy Bonez – Vol.1 – (duet with Udo Dirkschneider on First to Go – Last to Know)

2014
 Delain – The Human Contradiction – (vocals on "Your Body Is a Battleground" & "Sing to Me")

2016
 Avantasia – Ghostlights – (vocals on "Master of the Pendulum")

2018
 Ayreon – Ayreon Universe – The Best of Ayreon Live – (vocals)
 Dark Sarah – The Golden Moth – (vocals on "The Gods Speak")

2019
 Delain – Hunter's Moon – (vocals on the live tracks)

2020
 Jupiterium – 'King of Spades', a tribute song to Lemmy – (vocals)

2021
 Therion – Leviathan – (vocals on "Tuonela")
 Circus of Rock – Come One, Come All – (vocals on "Sheriff of Ghost")
 Waltari – 3rd Decade - Anniversary Edition – (vocals on "Below Zero")
 Mika Jaakola – Dark Slide Inc. – (vocals on Soita)

2022
 HiSQ – Flesh and Blood – (vocals)

2023
 Delain – Dark Waters – (vocals on "Invictus")

 In-studio 

Amorphis
 Far from the Sun (2003) – producer
 Eclipse (2006) – producer
 Silent Waters (2007) – producer
 Skyforger (2009) – producer
 The Beginning of Times (2011) – producer

Warmath
 Gehenna (1990) – producer
 Damnation Play'' (1991) – producer

References

Sources

External links

 Nightwish official site
 Marco's profile on Nightwish.com
 Marco Hietala's page on Tarot's official website

1966 births
Living people
People from Kuopio
Finnish heavy metal bass guitarists
Finnish heavy metal singers
Finnish heavy metal guitarists
21st-century Finnish male singers
Finnish male singer-songwriters
Finnish tenors
Nightwish members
Male bass guitarists
Sinergy members
Tarot (band) members
Northern Kings members
20th-century Finnish male singers
Masked Singer winners
Finnish expatriates in Spain